Otto-Raúl González (January 1, 1921 in Guatemala City – June 23, 2007 in Mexico City) was a Guatemalan writer, poet, and lawyer. A longtime communist ideologue, during the social revolution of the administration of Jacobo Arbenz he was appointed undersecretary of the land reform program. González welcomed Che Guevara to Guatemala and gave him a government job. However, he had to flee his country following the 1954 overthrow of the government and for two years lived in Ecuador then went to Mexico.

González obtained a law degree from the National Autonomous University of Mexico.

Many decades later, he was allowed back to Guatemala by President Vinicio Cerezo. During his lifetime, González published more than 60 books with a number translated to several different languages. He was awarded the Premio Nacional de Poesía Jaime Sabines from Mexico and the 1990 Guatemala National Prize in Literature.

References
 Prensa Libre Interview with Otto-Raúl González (Spanish language)
 Note about Gonzalez death  (La Joranada, Spanish language)

External links
Otto-Raúl González on the Guatemalan Literature Webpage

Guatemalan male poets
Guatemalan communists
20th-century Guatemalan lawyers
National Autonomous University of Mexico alumni
1921 births
2007 deaths
People from Guatemala City
Guatemalan expatriates in Mexico
20th-century Guatemalan poets
20th-century male writers
Expatriates in Ecuador